The CN Rail Bridge is a truss bridge over the Fraser River. It was built in 1914 by the Grand Trunk Pacific Railway and designed by Joseph Legrand. It is the longest railroad bridge in British Columbia.

The central span is a bascule bridge that could open to allow shipping on the river. It was designed by Joseph Strauss, future engineer of the Golden Gate Bridge. The lift span stopped being used in 1954.

Its arrival lead to the founding of the City of Prince George near the fur trading post Fort George (electoral district).

See also
 List of crossings of the Fraser River
 List of bridges in Canada

References

Bridges completed in 1914
Bridges over the Fraser River
Canadian National Railway bridges in Canada
Railway bridges in British Columbia
Truss bridges in Canada